The Golden Sun Bird or the Sun and Immortal Birds Gold Ornament is an ancient artifact, unearthed in 2001 from the Jinsha Ruins in Chengdu City, Sichuan Province, China.

It is a ring-shaped piece of foil, made of nearly pure gold. The pattern consists of four birds, flying in the same counterclockwise direction, located around the perimeter. The center is a sun pattern with twelve points. It is 12.5 cm in diameter, with a 5.29 cm inner diameter. It has a thickness of 0.02 cm, and weighs 20 grams.

The piece is from the late Sanxingdui culture, and is now located in the Chengdu Jinsha Ruins Museum.

Logo Function

It is the logo of China Cultural Heritage. In 2011, the city of Chengdu selected the Golden Sun Bird as the design for its logo. The pattern is featured on the coat of arms of Joseph Tang Yuange, Catholic Bishop of Chengdu since 2016, as well as on the coat of arms of the Diocese of Chengdu. The sun bird was also used as the elements of the 2023 Summer World University Games in Chengdu.

See also 
 List of Chinese cultural relics forbidden to be exhibited abroad

References

Shu (state)
Culture in Chengdu
Gold objects
Shang dynasty
Chinese art